Stephania tuberosa is a plant in the family Menispermaceae which is endemic to Queensland.

Conservation
This species is listed by the Queensland Department of Environment and Science as least concern. , it has not been assessed by the IUCN.

References

External links
 
 View a map of recorded sightings of Stephania tuberosa at the Australasian Virtual Herbarium

tuberosa